Mirror, Mirror is a fantasy novel by American writer Gregory Maguire, published in 2003. The novel is a revisionist version of the tale of Snow White set in rural Italy and featuring the historical Borgia family, with Lucrezia Borgia in the role of the Evil Queen.

Plot summary

In Montefiore, Italy in the early 16th century, a nobleman named Don Vicente de Nevada lives on a small estate with his seven-year-old daughter, Bianca, and a small staff, two of whom are Primavera, an earthy cook and a friar Fra Ludovico. The eponymous mirror was fashioned by dwarves and left in the pond to temper, where, at the beginning of the novel, it is found by de Nevada.

Life is good for the family until the day the duchess Lucrezia Borgia and her brother, Cesare, decadent children of a pope, come to visit. Cesare sends Vincente on a quest for a holy relic. While he is gone, Bianca becomes a young woman and Lucrezia becomes jealous of the girl's beauty and stealing Cesare's attention from Lucrezia. Eventually she hires a hunter to kill Bianca, who instead helps her escape from Lucrezia. The girl escapes, and runs into seven dwarfs, who are looking for the eighth dwarf and their mirror. The eighth dwarf is accompanying and protecting de Nevada on his travels.

When the mirror reveals to the duchess that her plan has failed, she takes it into her own hands to kill Bianca. When she eventually succeeds, Bianca is placed in a coffin, with the now-liberated mirror allowing passers-by to view her beauty. Eventually, she is awakened subsequent to a kiss from the very hunter who helped her escape. The device by which the kiss cures her of mercury poisoning is left unexplained by the author.

Reception 
Reviews for Mirror, Mirror were mixed. While Kirkus Reviews called it "Every bit as good as Wicked," The AV Club said, "Too many of the well-drawn principals turn out to be window dressing, too many of the plotlines dribble out into emptiness, and too many of his elaborations amount to misdirection."

External links
Gregory Maguire's website

References

2003 American novels
American fantasy novels
American historical novels
Novels by Gregory Maguire
Works based on Snow White
Novels based on fairy tales
Novels set in Italy
Emilia-Romagna
Cultural depictions of Cesare Borgia
Cultural depictions of Lucrezia Borgia